The Community of St John Baptist (CSJB), also known as the Sisters of Mercy, or formerly Clewer Sisters, is an Anglican religious order of Augustinian nuns.

History

The Community was founded in England in 1852 by Harriet Monsell (the first Superior), a clergy widow, and Thomas Thellusson Carter, a priest at St Andrew's Church, Clewer, Windsor.  The purpose of the order was to help marginalised women – mainly single mothers, the homeless and sex trade workers – by providing them shelter and teaching them a trade.  The work of the sisters expanded to include administering and working in orphanages, schools, convalescent hospitals, soup kitchens, and women's hostels.

The Community is conspicuous amongst Anglican communities for its meteoric rise in numbers from the date of the foundation.  By the time of Carter's death in 1901 there were some 300 Sisters.  At its height, the Community had some 45 priories and branch houses.

CSJB in the United Kingdom

The community's headquarters were, historically, at their purpose-built Victorian convent in Hatch Lane, Clewer, Windsor. This very large and imposing structure, by Henry Woodyer, is a local landmark, and includes a highly decorated chapel, and extensive accommodation for sisters, guests, and the female destitute persons to whom the community traditionally gave shelter. Following a sharp decrease in membership, the community found itself using only a tiny part of the buildings, and in 2001 relocated to Oxfordshire. The original convent has since been converted into flats. William Henry Hutchings was Warden from 1865 to 1884 when he became rector of Pickering, Yorkshire. He was succeeded by Thomas Thellusson Carter.

The Sisters lived at Begbroke, near Kidlington in Oxfordshire for several years, then moved to their newly constructed Convent, Harriet Monsell House, which is on the campus of the Ripon College Cuddesdon a Church of England Theological College, in 2013.  They also endowed a new chapel, Bishop Edward King Chapel, for the college which will be part of the Community's lasting legacy to the Church after it has completed its work. The Chapel has won several architectural awards since its completion.

The Church of England's Clewer Initiative combating modern slavery is funded by the Community, and continues the Sisters' tradition of protecting the vulnerable and marginalized.

Since 1996 the remaining sisters of another Order, the Community of the Companions of Jesus the Good Shepherd have been living with the CSJB sisters, and although the two Orders remain quite distinct, they share accommodation and many other aspects of community life.

CSJB in the United States

The Community expanded to the United States in 1874, following the donation of property by the family of the first American CSJB sister. Work was needed among German immigrants in New York's Lower East Side, and the community moved there. The American Mother House was eventually established at Mendham, New Jersey. Work in New York was ended in 1976. In 2007, however, the Sisters returned to Manhattan, opening a branch house at the Church of Saint Mary the Virgin on Times Square, but in 2018 were recalled to the mother house.

The main convent at 82 West Main Street, Mendham, New Jersey, includes a retreat house for guests and also the community's historic church, all set in over 20 acres of land. The convent building was constructed as the Mother House of the American community in 1913. The sisters then closed down the Mother House at 233 E. 17th St. in Manhattan and moved permanently to Mendham in 1915. The Convent building was added to the American National Register of Historic Places (reference number 07000356) in 2007.  The architects of the main convent were Durr Friedley and William W. Cordingly. St Marguerite's Retreat House in Mendham, Built in 1908 in the 'Tudor Revival' style, was a home and school for girls until after World War II, and is now a working retreat house for all denominations. Its architects were James Layng Mills and John C. Greenleaf.

CSJB in India
The Community no longer operates in the Indian sub-continent. Historically, however, there were CSJB houses and missions in India. Their story has been recorded by Valerie Bonham in a book entitled Sisters of the Raj: the Clewer Sisters in India.

Character

Apart from ministries of social aid and assistance, members of the order live a life of prayer, and operate retreat facilities as well as providing retreats and spiritual direction. In these endeavours, they are guided by the Augustinian Rule's emphasis on community spirit.

References

External links
Website of the CSJB in England
Website of the CSJB in the United States
St Marguerite's Retreat House
Biographical information on Mother Harriet Monsell CSJB, Founder of the Community of St John Baptist

Anglican orders and communities
Religious organizations established in 1852
Anglican organizations established in the 19th century
Christian religious orders established in the 19th century
Episcopal Church in New Jersey
+
Properties of religious function on the National Register of Historic Places in New Jersey
Religious buildings and structures completed in 1908
Churches in Morris County, New Jersey
Mendham Borough, New Jersey
1852 establishments in England
1908 establishments in New Jersey
National Register of Historic Places in Morris County, New Jersey